Vinita Tripathi (born 15 October 1980) is an Indian sprinter. She competed in the women's 4 × 100 metres relay at the 2000 Summer Olympics.

References

External links
 

1980 births
Living people
Athletes (track and field) at the 2000 Summer Olympics
Indian female sprinters
Olympic athletes of India
Place of birth missing (living people)
Athletes (track and field) at the 2002 Asian Games
Asian Games competitors for India
Olympic female sprinters